Angelito Rendon Lampon (born 1 March 1950) is a Philippine prelate of the Catholic Church who has been the Archbishop of Cotabato since 2019. He was Apostolic Vicar of Jolo from 1997 to 2018.

Biography
He was born on 1 March 1950 in M'Lang, Cotabato. He studied in local schools until 1962 and then at the novitiate in Tamontaka for four years. He studied philosophy at Ateneo de Manila University in 1968–69 and theology first in Quezon City in 1969–71 and then at the  Loyola School of Theology from 1972 to 1977.

He was ordained a priest there on 26 March 1977 as a member of the Oblates of Mary Immaculate (OMI) on March 26, 1977.

He was a parish priest in Lebak, Sultan Kudarat and at the Cathedral of Cotabato (1977-1978). He then worked as a staff member of the Notre Dame Archdiocesan Seminary (1979-1981). Within the Oblates he was director of Postulants and Scholastics from 1988 to 1992, Provincial Superior of the Philippine Province from 1988 to 1992, and General Counsellor at their general administration in Rome from 1992 to 1997.

On 21 November 1997, Pope John Paul II appointed him titular bishop of Valliposita and Apostolic Vicar of Jolo, succeeding Bishop Benjamin de Jesus who was assassinated on February 4 of that year. He received his episcopal consecration in Rome from John Paul on 6 January 1998.

Within the Catholic Bishops' Conference of the Philippines, Lampon headed the Commission on Interreligious Dialogue from 2011 to 2017. He then chaired its Commission on Ecumenical Affairs.

On 27 October 2012, Pope Benedict XVI named him a member of the Pontifical Council for Interreligious Dialogue.

On 11 November 2018, Pope Francis appointed him Archbishop of Cotabato succeeding Orlando Cardinal Quevedo who retired five days earlier. He was installed there on 31 January 2019.

References

External links

 

1950 births
Living people
21st-century Roman Catholic archbishops in the Philippines
People from South Cotabato
Missionary Oblates of Mary Immaculate
Members of the Pontifical Council for Justice and Peace
Members of the Pontifical Council for Interreligious Dialogue
Ateneo de Manila University alumni
Roman Catholic archbishops of Cotabato